Wuchang station may refer to:

 Wuchang railway station, a major railway station in Wuhan, China
 Wuchang railway station (Heilongjiang), a railway station in Heilongjiang, China
 Wuchang railway station (Sichuan), a railway station in Sichuan, China
 Wuchang station (Hangzhou Metro), a metro station in Hangzhou, China